This is a list of number-one songs in the United States during the year 1943 according to Billboard magazine.

The "National Best Selling Retail Records" chart was the first to poll retailers nationwide on record sales.

The new chart was billed as a "trade service feature," based on the "10 best selling records of the past week" at a selection of national retailers from New York to Los Angeles.

Shown is a list of songs that topped the National Best Selling Retail Records chart.

See also
1943 in music

References

1943
1943 record charts
1943 in American music